State Route 424 (SR 424) is a  east-west state highway in southern Carroll County, Tennessee. It connects the communities of Cedar Grove and Yuma with the town of Clarksburg.

Route description

SR 424 begins just north of Cedar Grove at an intersection with US 70 (SR 1). It winds its way east through wooded and slightly hilly terrain for several miles, where it crosses over the Rutherford Fork of the Obion River, before turning northeast farmland and entering Clarksburg. The highway has a short concurrency with SR 22 through the town’s main business district before leaving Clarksburg and continuing southeast through farmland. SR 424 briefly passes through a wooded area, where it crosses over the Big Sandy River, before it passes through Yuma and turns northeast, just shortly before it comes to an end at an intersection with SR 114. The entire route of SR 424 is a two-lane highway.

Major intersections

References

424
Transportation in Carroll County, Tennessee